Hippolyte bifidirostris is a chameleon shrimp of the family Hippolytidae, found around New Zealand at depths of . It may also occur on Australia's Great Barrier Reef, but that record may need to be confirmed.

References

Hippolytidae
Marine crustaceans of New Zealand
Crustaceans of Australia
Crustaceans described in 1876
Taxa named by Edward J. Miers